, also known as Saint Andrew's University, is a private university, established under Anglican Christian auspices, in Izumi, Osaka.

History
The university was granted its charter in 1959.

Organization

Faculties
 International Studies and Liberal Arts
 Sociology
 Economics
 Business Administration
 Law

Graduate schools
 Letters
 Sociology
 Economics
 Business Administration

Activities 

The university has a large variety of sports teams including:: archery, aikido, American football, karate, Japanese fencing, tennis, baseball, golf, cycling, automobile, jyudo, weight lifting, softball, swimming, cross-country skiing, table tennis, soft tennis, kenpo, basketball, badminton, volleyball, fencing, ten-pin bowling, boxing, rugby, athletic sports, wrestling, ice hockey, lacrosse and cheerleading. 

It also has cultural groups, including: English studying society, Juvenile literature research, glee, light music, wind-instrument, fork music, movie research, drama, advertising research, tea ceremony, photograph department, calligraphy, art, chess club, fishing research, railway research, buraku liberation research, student broadcasting station and Momoyama publishing association.

Exchange students 
Momoyama Gakuin university has partnerships in the world with: Canada, United Kingdom, Germany, France, Austria, the Netherlands, Italy, Spain, Sweden, Finland, Czech republic, Russia, Poland, Canada, USA, Korea, China, Taiwan, Vietnam, Indonesia, India, Australia.  All exchange students have to study Japanese.

References

External links
 Momoyama Gakuin University

Education in Osaka
Private universities and colleges in Japan
Universities and colleges in Osaka Prefecture
Association of Christian Universities and Colleges in Asia
Anglican Church in Japan
Kansai Collegiate American Football League
Izumi, Osaka
Christian universities and colleges in Japan
Educational institutions established in 1959
1959 establishments in Japan